Midun Island or Miduun Island is an unhabituated island in Aleutians East Borough, Alaska, United States.

Midun Island was named by W. H. Dall, of the U.S. Coast and Geodetic Survey, in 1882.

References 

Islands of Aleutians East Borough, Alaska
Islands of the Aleutian Islands
Uninhabited islands of Alaska
Islands of Alaska